Raúl Ricardo Duarte Barrios (born 18 July 1969 in Asunción) is a Paraguay football manager and former player who played as a forward. He is the current manager of Ecuadorian club Deportivo Quito.

During his professional career, Duarte played for clubs in Chile and Ecuador. He retired in 2006, and started his managerial career in 2011, only working with teams of the latter country.

External links
 FEF player card 
 

1969 births
Living people
Paraguayan footballers
Paraguayan expatriate footballers
Paraguayan football managers
12 de Octubre Football Club players
Everton de Viña del Mar footballers
Deportes La Serena footballers
Puerto Montt footballers
C.D. Huachipato footballers
C.S.D. Macará footballers
C.D. ESPOLI footballers
Delfín S.C. footballers
S.D. Aucas footballers
C.D. Universidad Católica del Ecuador footballers
Chilean Primera División players
Expatriate footballers in Chile
Expatriate footballers in Ecuador
Expatriate football managers in Ecuador
Association football forwards
Paraguayan expatriate football managers
Delfín S.C. managers
S.D. Quito managers
Cumbayá F.C. managers
Fuerza Amarilla S.C. managers